Malatiná is a village and municipality in Dolný Kubín District in the Žilina Region of northern Slovakia.

History
In historical records the village was first mentioned in 1313.

Geography
The municipality lies at an altitude of 803 metres and covers an area of 19.141 km². It has a population of about 824 people.

References

External links
  Malatiná Municipal Website (in Slovak)

Villages and municipalities in Dolný Kubín District